William Ivy Hair (19301992) was an American historian and the Fuller E. Callaway Professor of Southern History at Georgia College in Milledgeville, Georgia.

Life

Early life and education
William Ivy Hair was born on November 19, 1930, in Monroe, Louisiana. He attended Louisiana State University (LSU), where he was manager of the school's newspaper The Daily Reveille. After earning a BA and MA, Hair joined the United States Army in 1954. He was honorably discharged in 1956.

Academic career
After his discharge, Hair returned to LSU as a graduate. While there he met and married Emily Karolyn Stevens. In 1957, the couple moved to Florida State University (FSU), where he was a visiting professor from 1957 to 1963. After finishing his history Ph.D. in 1962, Hair became a visiting professor at LSU. However, he returned to FSU again, where he served as Assistant Professor at FSU in 1963 and rose to a full Professor by 1969. He also became the chair of the History Department and published his first book, Bourbonism and Agrarian Protest: Louisiana Politics: 1877-1900.

Death
Hair died on August 6, 1992.

Bibliography
Kingfish and His Realm: The Life and Times of Huey P. Long
Bourbonism and Agrarian Protest: Louisiana Politics, 1877-1900
Carnival of Fury: Robert Charles and the New Orleans Race Riot of 1900

References

Historians of Louisiana
Georgia College & State University faculty
People from Monroe, Louisiana
Louisiana State University alumni
1930 births
1992 deaths